This page is a list of all the matches that Algeria national football team has played between 2010 and 2019.

2010

2011

2012

2013

2014

2015

2016

2017

2018

2019

Key: GS, Group stage; R16, round of 16; QF, quarter-finals; SF, semi-finals; 3rd, third-place match; FWC, FIFA World Cup; FWC Q, FIFA World Cup

Notes

References

External links
Algeria: Fixtures and Results - FIFA.com

2010s in Algeria
2010-2019
2009–10 in Algerian football
2010–11 in Algerian football
2011–12 in Algerian football
2012–13 in Algerian football
2013–14 in Algerian football
2014–15 in Algerian football
2015–16 in Algerian football
2016–17 in Algerian football